Rowland White may refer to:
 Rowland White (British writer) (born 1970), British writer on aviation
 Rowland White (Irish writer) (died 1572), Irish writer, and political and religious reformer

See also
 Rowland Whyte (died after 1626), Elizabethan official and businessman